Lynton is a small village in Devon, England.

Lynton may also refer to:

Places

Australia
 Lynton, South Australia, a settlement
 Lynton railway station
 Lynton, Western Australia, a settlement
 Lynton Convict Hiring Depot

Canada
 Lynton, Alberta

People
 Thomas de Lynton (fl. 1380s), Canon of Windsor

Given name Lynton
 Lynton Brent (1897–1981), American film actor
 Lynton Crosby (born 1956), Australian political strategist
 Lynton K. Caldwell (1913–2006), American political scientist
 Lynton Wilson (born 1940), Canadian businessperson
 Lynton Rowlands (born 1961), Australian cricketer
 Lynton Y. Ballentine (1899–1964), American politician

Surname Lynton
 Michael Lynton (born 1960), American businessperson
 Norbert Lynton (1927–2007), British art historian

Other uses
 Lynton, Burwood, a heritage-listed house in the Sydney suburb of Burwood, New South Wales
 Lynton Formation, part of the late Devonian Exmoor Group